"The Morning" is a song by Canadian singer the Weeknd from his debut mixtape, House of Balloons (2011). It was written by the Weeknd, Doc McKinney and Illangelo, and produced by the latter two. "The Morning" was placed on Pitchforks list of top 100 songs of 2011 at number 15. In 2012, it was remastered and released on the Weeknd's compilation album, Trilogy. In 2021, the Weeknd included it on his greatest hits album, The Highlights and in 2023 it was featured on his live album, Live at SoFi Stadium. The Weeknd has performed it during all of his tours.

Charts

Certifications

References

External links
 
 
 

2011 songs
The Weeknd songs
Songs written by the Weeknd
Songs written by Illangelo
Songs written by Doc McKinney
Song recordings produced by Illangelo
XO (record label) singles